Abdul Aziz (born on 10 November 1924 at Sadiali, Chakwal and died on 29 September 1996) was a Pakistani sprinter. He competed in the men's 100 metres at the 1952 Summer Olympics.

References

1924 births
Year of death missing
Athletes (track and field) at the 1952 Summer Olympics
Athletes (track and field) at the 1956 Summer Olympics
Pakistani male sprinters
Olympic athletes of Pakistan
Athletes (track and field) at the 1954 British Empire and Commonwealth Games
Commonwealth Games competitors for Pakistan
Place of birth missing
Asian Games medalists in athletics (track and field)
Asian Games silver medalists for Pakistan
Athletes (track and field) at the 1954 Asian Games
Medalists at the 1954 Asian Games
20th-century Pakistani people